Alan Vester (born 27 March 1977 in Aarhus) is a super lightweight Danish boxer who turned pro in 1998. He challenged once for the IBF World Super Lightweight title in 2001.

Professional boxing record

References 

1977 births
Living people
Danish male boxers
Boxing in Denmark
Light-welterweight boxers
Sportspeople from Aarhus